The Czechoslovak Supercup (Czech/) is an annual football match between the winners of the Czech Cup and the Slovak Cup.

The first Czechoslovak Supercup was held on 23 June 2017. The first champions were the Czech side Zlín.

Format 
The Supercup is played as a single match with no extra time and a penalty shoot-out if the score is tied after 90 minutes of play. In 2017, the winner received CZK 500,000 (€19,000) in prize money, while the loser received half of that sum.

Finals by year 

Notes

References 

Supercup
Supercup
National association football supercups